Sujith Sarang (born 22 June 1985) is an Indian cinematographer known for his work in  Dhuruvangal Pathinaaru, Taxiwaala, Dear Comrade, Mudhal Nee Mudivum Nee, Kanam and Oke Oka Jeevitham. He works predominantly in Tamil, Telugu, and Malayalam Industries. He is an alumnus of MGR Film and television Institute. He is a Tamil nadu Government State Award winner for being Best Student Cinematographer of 2008-2009 year.

Early life 
Sujith was born into a family of artists. His father, Sarangadharan KR was a drawing teacher in a school in Palakkad. He was also a karate and tai chi expert. Sujith Sarang grew up watching his father's paintings. He never had the intention to go into film making until his brother Sreejith Sarang, a film editor and colorist, guided him to join the film institute. Growing up around his father's paintings had given Sujith a sense of colour, composition, and framing. He was also a national champion in karate along with his brother Sreejith and sister Sreeja. Sujith is graduated from Shri Nehru Maha Vidyalaya, Coimbatore in Physics, and completed a diploma in film technology from M.G.R Film and Television Training Institute, formerly known as Adayar Film Institute.

Education 
Sujith hail from Coimbatore. He did his schooling in C.S.I boys higher secondary school & V.L.B Janaki ammal Matriculation school Coimbatore.. He has a bachelor's degree in physics from Shri Nehru Maha Vidyalaya, Coimbatore, as well as a diploma in film technology from M.G.R Film and television training institute formerly known as Adayar Film Institute. He was the gold medallist (T.K.Venkat memorial endowment award) during his 2006-2009 batch.He received Tamilnadu state award for being the Best Student Cinematographer in the year 2008-2009 from Government of Tamilnadu

Career 
In 2008, Sujith Sarang started his career as an independent cinematographer. In 2010, subsequently, he started doing short films and advertisements. He was known for his Tamil short films 5 Rooba, Pannaiyarum Padminiyum, Vyugam, Pechhi, Aghavizhi, and Telugu short film Maro Prapancham. Gradually from the year 2011, he began working for feature films, and his debut film was Alias Janaki in the Telugu industry, which won Andhra Govt's Nandi Award for the Best Feature Film on National Integration.

Later, he did the cinematography for films such as Thaakka Thaakka, Dhuruvangal Pathinaaru (D-16), Angels, IDI (Inspector Dawood Ibrahim), Taxiwaala, Naragasooran, Dear Comrade, Suttupidikka Utharavu, Champion under Suseenthiran direction, Darbuka Siva's Mudhal Nee Mudivum Nee, Oke Oka Jeevitham for Dream Warrior starring Sharwanand, Amala Akkineni, Ritu Varma, Nasser and Navarasa for Netflix.

Filmography

References

Sources

 https://www.thehindu.com/entertainment/movies/Lighting-the-way/article17004256.ece

External links 

Indian cinematographers
Malayalam film cinematographers
Tamil film cinematographers
Telugu film cinematographers
1985 births
Living people